A Revolutionary Family (translit. Geming jiating) is a 1961 Chinese drama film directed by Shui Hua. It was entered into the 2nd Moscow International Film Festival.

Cast
 Shi Xiaoman
 Sun Daolin
 Yu Lan as Zhou Lian
 Zhang Lian

References

External links
 

1961 films
1961 drama films
Chinese drama films
Chinese black-and-white films
1960s Mandarin-language films